Van Krevelen diagrams are graphical plots developed by
Dirk Willem van Krevelen (chemist and professor of  fuel technology at the TU Delft) and used to assess the origin and maturity of kerogen and petroleum. The diagram cross-plots the hydrogen:carbon atomic ratio as a function of the oxygen:carbon atomic ratio.

Beginning around 2003, the diagrams are often used to visualize data from mass spectrometry analysis, used for mixtures other than kerogen and petroleum. For example, the diagrams have been used in one analysis of the  components in Scotch whiskey.

Types of kerogen

Different types of kerogen have differing potentials to produce oil during maturation. These various types of kerogen can be distinguished on a van Krevelen diagram.

See also
 Petroleum geology
 Maturity (geology)

References

 van Krevelen, D.W. (1950). "Graphical-statistical method for the study of structure and reaction processes of coal", Fuel, 29, 269–84.
 van Krevelen, D.W. and Schuyer, J. (1957) Coal science. Elsevier publishing company.
 The chemistry and technology of petroleum

Geochemistry
Petroleum geology